FantasyGuru.com, launched in 1995, is a subscription-based fantasy football website. The company, which originated as a newsletter published by owner John Hansen, entered its 17th year in business in 2011. Specializing in the National Football League, the site provides projections, statistical analysis, player rankings, and other tools for subscribers. The site's staff also produces regular podcasts and is active in social networking, with accounts on Facebook and Twitter.

History
Hansen started the Guru Report Newsletter as a side project in 1995, and continued mailing and faxing hardcopies until 1997. In 1998, Hansen turned the publication into a website and eventually an annual magazine, opting for online-only content with the discontinuation of the magazine in 2009. Additionally, in 2006, Hansen began publishing a syndicated column for King Features.

Starting in 2003 and continuing today, FantasyGuru.com regularly produces content for Yahoo's fantasy section.

Radio
In 2004, Hansen and FoxSports.com’s Adam Caplan began hosting SiriusXM Fantasy Football, which aired Friday nights during the NFL season on Sirius NFL Radio.

The success of the show prompted SiriusXM to create SiriusXM Fantasy Sports Radio, giving FantasyGuru.com a seven-day-a-week program during the NFL season, including senior writers Matt Camp and Joe Dolan picking up a weekend edition of the program. SiriusXM vice president of sports Steve Cohen said the fantasy show's success on Sirius NFL Radio helped to lay the groundwork for the channel and convinced the company "to keep building on" the fantasy platform.

With the channel, Hansen and his staff have participated in multiple expert drafts. Additionally, Hansen has participated in celebrity drafts and, in 2010, Hansen hosted Ashton Kutcher's celebrity draft auction live from Las Vegas.

The Elite Sports show on SiriusXM Fantasy Sports Radio is hosted by Jeff Mans who took over as operator of Fantasy Guru for John Hansen.

Television
Hansen was among the first fantasy writers to publish content for ESPN.com when the site was in its infancy, and he parlayed that experience into appearing on-camera in projects with NFL.com, NFL Network, DirectTV, and the Comcast SportsNet television show Fantasy Fix.

Staff
Jeff Mans, Chief Content Officer 
Ray Flowers, Managing Editor
Armando Marsal, Senior Writer
Russell Clay, Senior Analyst
Tyler Buecher, Senior Analyst
Ted Schuster, Senior Analyst
Mike Horn, Staff Writer
Rob Povia, Staff Writer/Editor
Brett Wojtkowski, Staff Writer
Jason Bales, Staff Writer
Cole Shelton, Staff Writer

References

External links

Fantasy sports websites
Daily fantasy sports
Internet properties established in 1995
Sirius XM Radio channels